The 1970 San Diego Padres season was the second season in franchise history. The Padres improved by 11 wins from their inaugural season in 1969.

Offseason
 January 17, 1970: John Scott was drafted by the Padres in the 1st round (2nd pick) of the 1970 Major League Baseball draft (January).

Regular season
 June 12, 1970: Dock Ellis of the Pittsburgh Pirates threw a no-hitter against the Padres. The rumour is that Dock Ellis pitched the no-hitter on acid. The way Ellis tells the story, in Donald Hall's book, "In the Country of Baseball", the Pirates were starting a west-coast road trip. After the Pirates landed in San Diego, Ellis visited his hometown of L.A. for a party. Ellis forgot he was slated to pitch the next day. So he started doing acid the night before the game, and around 10 a.m., after catching maybe an hour of sleep, he realized he was in the wrong place.

Opening Day lineup
Ollie Brown
Dave Campbell
Chris Cannizzaro
Nate Colbert
Tommy Dean
Pat Dobson
Cito Gaston
Van Kelly
Jerry Morales

Season standings

Record vs. opponents

Notable transactions
 June 4, 1970: Dan Spillner was drafted by the Padres in the 2nd round of the 1970 Major League Baseball draft.

Roster

Player stats

Batting

Starters by position
Note: Pos = Position; G = Games played; AB = At bats; H = Hits; Avg. = Batting average; HR = Home runs; RBI = Runs batted in

Other batters
Note: G = Games played; AB = At bats; H = Hits; Avg. = Batting average; HR = Home runs; RBI = Runs batted in

Pitching

Starting pitchers
Note: G = Games pitched; IP = Innings pitched; W = Wins; L = Losses; ERA = Earned run average; SO = Strikeouts

Other pitchers
Note: G = Games pitched; IP = Innings pitched; W = Wins; L = Losses; ERA = Earned run average; SO = Strikeouts

Relief pitchers 
Note: G = Games pitched; W = Wins; L = Losses; SV = Saves; ERA = Earned run average; SO = Strikeouts

Award winners

1970 Major League Baseball All-Star Game
Cito Gaston, outfield, reserve

Farm system

Elmira affiliation shared with Kansas City Royals

References

External links
 1970 San Diego Padres at Baseball Reference
 1970 San Diego Padres at Baseball Almanac

San Diego Padres seasons
San Diego Padres season
San Diego Padres